Sierra Sky Park Airport  is a privately owned, public-use airport  northwest of the central business district of Fresno, a city in Fresno County, California, United States.

Other area airports are Fresno Chandler Executive Airport and Fresno Yosemite International Airport.

History 
Sierra Sky Park was created in 1946 on 130 acres (52 ha) on the San Joaquin River, and was the first residential aviation community in the world. William and Doris Smilie are credited for creating this airport/ neighborhood hybrid and in 1953 built the first of the 110 homes in the project. Residents can land, taxi down extra-wide avenues, and pull up and park in the driveway at home.

Facilities and aircraft 
For the 12-month period ending March 29, 2007, the airport had 12,500 general aviation aircraft operations, an average of 34 per day. At that time there were 40 aircraft based at this airport:
98 percent single-engine and 2 percent multi-engine.

Accidents and incidents 
On December 26, 2016, an Express S-90 crashed onto the shore of a lake, 250 meters off runway 12. Both people on board were killed.

On May 2, 2020, the engine of a Cessna 172 Skyhawk failed after takeoff, and on return landing, the plane overran the end of the runway. The pilot walked away with bumps and scratches, and no one on the ground was injured.

References

External links 

Airports in Fresno County, California
Residential airparks